We're Only in It for the Money is the third studio album by American rock band the Mothers of Invention, released on March 4, 1968, by Verve Records. As with the band's first two efforts, it is a concept album, and satirizes left- and right-wing politics, particularly the hippie subculture, as well as the Beatles' album Sgt. Pepper's Lonely Hearts Club Band. It was conceived as part of a project called No Commercial Potential, which produced three other albums: Lumpy Gravy, Cruising with Ruben & the Jets, and Uncle Meat.

We're Only in It for the Money encompasses rock, experimental music, and psychedelic rock, with orchestral segments deriving from the recording sessions for Lumpy Gravy, which was previously issued as a solo instrumental album by Capitol Records and was subsequently reedited by frontman Frank Zappa and released by Verve; the reedited Lumpy Gravy was produced simultaneously with We're Only in It for the Money and is the first part of a conceptual continuity, continued with the reedited Lumpy Gravy and concluded with Zappa's final album Civilization Phaze III (1994).

Background 
While filming Uncle Meat, Frank Zappa recorded in New York City for a project called No Commercial Potential, which ended up producing four albums: We're Only in It for the Money; a revised version of Zappa's solo album Lumpy Gravy; Cruising with Ruben & the Jets; and Uncle Meat, which served as the soundtrack to the film of the same name, which finally saw a release in 1987, albeit in incomplete form.

Zappa stated, "It's all one album. All the material in the albums is organically related and if I had all the master tapes and I could take a razor blade and cut them apart and put it together again in a different order it still would make one piece of music you can listen to. Then I could take that razor blade and cut it apart and reassemble it a different way, and it still would make sense. I could do this twenty ways. The material is definitely related."

As the recording sessions continued, the Beatles released their acclaimed album Sgt. Pepper's Lonely Hearts Club Band. In response to the album's release, Zappa decided to change the album's concept to parody the Beatles album, because he felt that the Beatles were insincere and "only in it for the money". The Beatles were targeted as a symbol of Zappa's objections to the corporatization of youth culture, and the album served as a criticism of them and psychedelic rock as a whole.

Recording 

Band member Ray Collins had left the Mothers before the New York recording sessions took place, but later rejoined when the band was recording the doo-wop songs that formed the album Cruisin' with Ruben & the Jets. Gary Kellgren was hired as an engineer for the project, and subsequently wound up delivering whispered pieces of dialogue that linked segments of We're Only in It for the Money. During the recording sessions, Verve requested that Zappa remove a verse from the song "Mother People". Zappa complied, but reversed the recording and included the backwards verse as part of the dialogue track "Hot Poop", concluding the album's first side, but this would be removed by Verve themselves on subsequent represses of their own. Also censored on all copies was the Lenny Bruce reference in "Harry, You're A Beast", and a spoken segment of "Concentration Moon" in which Kellgren called the Velvet Underground "as shitty a group as Frank Zappa's group".

While recording We're Only in It for the Money, Zappa discovered that the strings of Apostolic Studios' grand piano would resonate if a person spoke near those strings. The "piano people" experiment involved Zappa having various speakers improvise dialogue using topics offered by Zappa. Various people contributed to these sessions, including Eric Clapton, Rod Stewart and Tim Buckley. The "piano people" voices primarily consisted of Motorhead Sherwood, Roy Estrada, Spider Barbour, All-Night John (the manager of the studio) and Louis Cuneo, who was noted for his laugh, which sounded like a "psychotic turkey".

During the production, Zappa experimented with recording and editing techniques which produced unusual textures and musique concrète compositions; the album featured abbreviated songs interrupted by segments of dialogue and unrelated music which changed the continuity of the album. Segments of orchestral music included on the album came from a solo orchestral album by Zappa previously released by Capitol Records under the title Lumpy Gravy in 1967. MGM claimed that Zappa was under contractual obligation to record for them, and subsequently Zappa re-edited Lumpy Gravy, releasing a drastically different version on Verve Records, after the release of We're Only in It for the Money. The artwork of Lumpy Gravy identified it as "phase 2 of We're Only in It for the Money", while We're Only in It for the Money was identified in its artwork as "phase one of Lumpy Gravy", alluding to the conceptual continuity of the two albums.

For some pressings of the album, MGM censored several tracks without Zappa's knowledge, involvement or permission. On the song "Absolutely Free", the line "I don't do publicity balling for you anymore" was edited by MGM to remove the word "balling", changing the meaning of the sentence. Additionally, on "Let's Make the Water Turn Black", the line "and I still remember Mama, with her apron and her pad, feeding all the boys at Ed's Cafe" was removed. Zappa later learned that this line was censored because an MGM executive thought that the word "pad" referred to a sanitary napkin, rather than a waitress's order pad. The Kellgren dialogue segment in "Concentration Moon" was also re-edited, making it seem that he was calling the Velvet Underground "Frank Zappa's group." Zappa later declined to accept an award for the album upon being made aware of the censorship, stating "I prefer that the award be presented to the guy who modified this record, because what you're hearing is more reflective of his work than mine."

Themes 

In his lyrics for We're Only in It for the Money, Zappa speaks as a voice for "the freaks—imaginative outsiders who didn't fit comfortably into any group", according to AllMusic writer Steve Huey. Subsequently, the album satirizes hippie culture and left-wing politics, as well as targeting right-wing politics, describing both political sides as "prisoners of the same narrow-minded, superficial phoniness."

Zappa later stated in 1978, "hippies were pretty stupid. ... the people involved in [youth] processes ... are very sensitive to criticism. They always take themselves too seriously. So anybody who impugns the process, whether it's a peace march or love beads or whatever it is – that person is the enemy and must be dealt with severely. So we came under a lot of criticism, because we dared to suggest that perhaps what was going on was really stupid."

Another element of the album's lyrical content came from the Los Angeles Police Department's harassment and arrests of young rock fans, which made it difficult for the band to perform on the West Coast, leading the band to move to New York City for better financial opportunities. Additionally, Zappa made reference to comedian Lenny Bruce; the song "Harry, You're A Beast" quotes Bruce's routine "To Is A Preposition, Come Is A Verb".

The song "Flower Punk" parodies the garage rock staple "Hey Joe", and depicts a youth going to San Francisco to become a flower child and join a psychedelic rock band. Additionally, the track makes a reference to "Wild Thing", one of the songs that defined the counterculture of that period. The rhythmic pattern of "Flower Punk" is complex, consisting of 4 bars of a fast 5 (2–3), followed by 4 bars of 7 (2–2–3).

Packaging 

Zappa's art director Cal Schenkel and Jerry Schatzberg photographed a collage for the album cover, which parodied the Beatles' Sgt. Pepper's Lonely Hearts Club Band. Zappa spent US$4,000 on the photo shoot, which he stated was "a direct negative" of the Sgt. Pepper album cover. "[Sgt. Pepper] had blue skies ... we had a thunderstorm." Jimi Hendrix, a friend of Zappa, took part in the photo shoot.

Zappa phoned Paul McCartney, seeking permission for the parody. McCartney told him that it was an issue for business managers, but Zappa responded that the artists themselves were supposed to tell their business managers what to do. Nevertheless, Capitol objected, and the album's release was delayed for five months. Verve decided to package the album with inverted cover artwork, placing the parody cover as interior artwork (and the intended interior artwork as the main sleeve) out of fear of legal action. Zappa was angered over the decision; Schenkel felt that the Sgt. Pepper parody "was a stronger image" than the final released cover. In recent years, the album has been reissued with the intended front cover.

Release
The album was released on March 4, 1968, by Verve Records. It peaked at number 30 on the Billboard 200.

In 1984, Zappa prepared a remix of the album for its compact disc reissue and the vinyl box set The Old Masters I. The remix reinstated audio that had been censored by Verve, as well as the original "Mother People" verse. It also featured new rhythm tracks recorded by bassist Arthur Barrow and drummer Chad Wackerman. Zappa would later do the same with Cruising with Ruben & the Jets, stating "The master tapes for Ruben and the Jets were in better shape, but since I liked the results on We're Only in It for the Money, I decided to do it on Ruben too. But those are the only two albums on which the original performances were replaced. I thought the important thing was the material itself."

Lumpy Gravy was also remixed by Zappa, but not released at the time. After the remixing was announced, a $13 million lawsuit was filed against Zappa by Jimmy Carl Black, Bunk Gardner and Don Preston, who were later joined by Ray Collins, Art Tripp and Motorhead Sherwood, increasing the claim to $16.4 million, stating that they had received no royalties from Zappa since 1969.

Zappa would later prepare a CD of the original stereo mix for release by Rykodisc in 1995. Unlike the remix, this retained the censorship applied to "Concentration Moon," "Harry You're a Beast" and "Mother People" on the original releases.

The audio documentary box set The Lumpy Money Project/Object chronicles the production of We're Only in It for the Money, including the orchestral version of Lumpy Gravy, a 1968 mono mix of We're Only in It for the Money and 1984 remixes of We're Only in It for the Money and the reedited Lumpy Gravy album, as well as additional material from the original recording sessions.

Reception and legacy 

Barret Hansen praised the album in an April 1968 review for Rolling Stone. He felt it was the most "advanced" rock album released up to that date, though not necessarily the "best"; he compared Zappa with the Beatles, and felt that the wit and sharpness of Zappa's lyrics was more intelligent, but unless one were to adopt a utilitarian view, he would not deny the beauty of the Beatles' music. He concluded that while the initial listening may be significantly profound, due to the reliance on shock, subsequent listening may be reduced in value; and he returns to a comparison with the Beatles, in which he feels that Zappa has the greater musical genius, but is less comfortable to listen to.

AllMusic writer Steve Huey wrote, "the music reveals itself as exceptionally strong, and Zappa's politics and satirical instinct have rarely been so focused and relevant, making We're Only in It for the Money quite possibly his greatest achievement." Robert Christgau gave the album an A, writing, "With bohemia permanent and changed utterly, this early attack on its massification hasn't so much dated as found its context. Cheap sarcasm is forever." In 2012, Uncut described the album as a "satirical psych-rock gem".

It was voted number 343 in the third edition of Colin Larkin's All Time Top 1000 Albums (2000). As of 2015, the album was ranked number 297 on Rolling Stone magazine's list of the 500 greatest albums of all time. Additionally, Rolling Stone ranked the album number 77 in its August 1987 article, "The Top 100: The Best Albums of the Last Twenty Years". It is also included in the book 1001 Albums You Must Hear Before You Die along with the Mothers' first release, Freak Out!.

In 2005, the U.S. National Recording Preservation Board included We're Only in It for the Money in the National Recording Registry, calling it "culturally, historically, and aesthetically significant" and "a scathing satire on hippiedom and America's reactions to it".

Track listing

Personnel
 The Mothers Today (as of 1967)
 Frank Zappa – guitar, piano, lead vocals & editing
 Jimmy Carl Black – drums, trumpet, vocals, Indian of the group
 Roy Estrada – electric bass, vocals, asthma
 Billy Mundi – drums, vocals, yak & black lace underwear
 Don Preston – retired
 Bunk Gardner – all woodwinds, mumbled weirdness
 Ian Underwood – piano, woodwinds, wholesome
 Euclid James "Motorhead" Sherwood – road manager, baritone saxophone, soprano saxophone, all purpose weirdness & teen appeal

(Subsequent CD releases of this album contain a paragraph on the sleeve titled "The Last Word," explaining that the Mothers band pictured on the album was not the band that played the music, and in fact all musical duties on the album were performed by Frank Zappa, Ian Underwood, Roy Estrada and Billy Mundi. Jimmy Carl Black, Don Preston, Bunk Gardner and Euclid James "Motorhead" Sherwood were all featured in some capacity on the record.)

 Additional personnel
 Suzy Creamcheese (Pamela Zarubica) – telephone voice
 Pamela Zarubica – vocals
 Dick Barber – Snorks
 Eric Clapton – Male speaking part in "Are You Hung Up?" and "Nasal Retentive Calliope Music."
 Gary Kellgren – "the one doing all the creepy whispering" (i.e., interstitial spoken segments)
 Spider Barbour – vocals
 Dick Kunc – "cheerful interruptions" vocal
 Vicki Kellgren – additional telephone vocals
 Ronnie Williams – backwards voice
 Sid Sharp – conductor (under Frank Zappa's supervision) of the "Abnuceals Emuukha Electric Symphony Orchestra and Chorus" on "Absolutely Free", "Mother People" and "The Chrome Plated Megaphone of Destiny"

 Production
Producer: Frank Zappa
Executive producer: Tom Wilson
Engineers: Gary Kellgren, Dick Kunc
Remixing: Dick Kunc
Editing: Dick Kunc, Frank Zappa
Arranger: Frank Zappa
Concept: Frank Zappa
Art direction: Cal Schenkel
Design: Cal Schenkel
Artwork: Cal Schenkel
Photography: Jerry Schatzberg
Fashion advisor: Tiger Morse
Wardrobe: Billy Mundi

Charts

See also 
 Album era

References

1968 albums
Albums produced by Frank Zappa
Acid rock albums
Concept albums
Frank Zappa albums
The Mothers of Invention albums
Self-censorship
United States National Recording Registry recordings
Verve Records albums
Albums recorded at Capitol Studios
United States National Recording Registry albums